Juan Vicente Fabbiani (1910-1989) was a Venezuelan painter.

Further reading

References

1910 births
1989 deaths
20th-century Venezuelan painters
20th-century Venezuelan male artists
Male painters